Cantwell Glacier is a glacier in Denali National Park and Preserve in the U.S. state of Alaska.

See also
 List of glaciers

References

Glaciers of Denali Borough, Alaska
Glaciers of Denali National Park and Preserve
Glaciers of Alaska